Olocau is a municipality in the comarca of Camp de Túria in the Valencian Community, Spain. The Iberian archaeological site of Puntal dels Llops is located in its surrounds.

References

External links
"Olocau
"Olocau.Digital"

Municipalities in Camp de Túria
Populated places in Camp de Túria